Karen Taylor-Good (born Karen Berke in El Paso, Texas) is an American singer-songwriter, and one half of the duo
StoweGood. Taylor-Good and her then-husband, Bill Taylor, started the Mesa Records label in 1982. Her first single, "Diamond in the Rough," reached the Top 40 on the Billboard Hot Country Singles chart early that year. Taylor-Good was nominated for Best New Female Vocalist at the 1984 Academy of Country Music Awards. After Mesa Records folded in 1986, she sang jingles for Taco Bell, United Airlines and Peter Pan Peanut Butter.

Taylor-Good became a Warner/Chappell Music songwriter in 1992. She wrote Top 5 songs for Patty Loveless ("How Can I Help You Say Goodbye") and Collin Raye ("Not That Different"). In 1996, she was named SESAC Songwriter of the Year. Her songs have since been recorded by Diamond Rio, Laura Branigan and Melissa Manchester.

She wrote a book, On Angel's Wings, and has produced eight CDs of her original material. Taylor-Good has presented her "musical keynotes" to many groups, including The American Business Women's Association, The National Hospice Foundation, and Lions Clubs International.

In 2011, Karen became part of the songwriting/performing duo, StoweGood, with author, hit songwriter, cancer survivor & sister-from-another-mister, Stowe Dailey. Stowe & Karen have written many, many tear and laugh-inducing songs which are available on their two studio albums, "Love Lives On" and "Beautiful Brokenness" and on their YouTube channel, https://www.youtube.com/channel/UC1cWSjUfI3NKfi8hZSOfoRQ. They share concerts and facilitate healing retreats across the US, Canada, Mexico, Ireland and the UK.

As of 2020, Karen is living in Nashville with her husband of 38 years, Dennis Good, and her daughter Rachael Good.

Discography

Albums

Singles

Singles written by Taylor-Good

References

External links

https://www.youtube.com/channel/UC1cWSjUfI3NKfi8hZSOfoRQ YouTube
[ Karen Taylor-Good] at Allmusic

American women country singers
American country singer-songwriters
Living people
People from El Paso, Texas
Singer-songwriters from Texas
Year of birth missing (living people)
Country musicians from Texas
21st-century American women